Jarnik is a surname. Notable people with the surname include:

 Urban Jarnik (1784–1844), Slovenian poet
 Vojtěch Jarník (1897–1970), Czech mathematician

See also
 4023 Jarník, a main belt asteroid
 Jarník algorithm, algorithm in graph theory developed by Vojtěch